The 2020–21 West Midlands (Regional) League season was the 121st in the history of the West Midlands (Regional) League (WMRL), a football competition in England which was formed in 1889. The league operated three divisions for the last time: the Premier Division, see below, at level 10 in the English football league system, Division One at level 11, and Division Two. The Premier Division was one of three divisions which fed into the Midland Football League Premier Division, the other two being the East Midlands Counties League and the Midland League's own Division One.

The allocations for Steps 5 and 6 for season 2020–21 were announced by the FA on 21 July, and were subject to appeal. The league season was subsequently abandoned on 24 February 2021.

Promotions and restructuring
The scheduled restructuring of non-League football took place at the end of the season, with new divisions added to the Combined Counties and United Counties leagues at Step 5 for 2021-22, along with new a division in the Northern Premier League at Step 4. Promotions from Steps 6 to 5 were based on points per game across all matches over the two cancelled seasons (2019-20 and 2020-21), while teams were promoted into Step 6 on the basis of a subjective application process. The Premier Division disbanded and therefore the WMRL lost its place at Step 6 or level 10, becoming a National League System county feeder, after most of its remaining clubs were assigned to the Hellenic and Midland leagues. The league was reduced to two regional divisions at levels 11-12.

Premier Division

The Premier Division for the final time comprised 18 teams, the same set of teams which competed in the previous season's aborted competition.

League table

References

2020-21
10
West Midlands (Regional) League, 2020-21